Gihungwe is a village in the Commune of Gihanga in Bubanza Province in north western Burundi, near the border of the Democratic Republic of the Congo.

References

External links
Satellite map at Maplandia.com

Populated places in Burundi
Bubanza Province